George N. Dale (February 19, 1834 – January 29, 1903) was a Vermont lawyer and politician who served as the 28th lieutenant governor of Vermont from 1870 to 1872. He was the father of Porter Hinman Dale, who served as a member of the United States House of Representatives and as a United States Senator.

Early life
George Needham Dale was born in Fairfax, Vermont on February 19, 1834. He was raised in Waitsfield and attended Thetford Academy. He studied law with Paul Dillingham and became an attorney. Dale settled in Essex County, first in Guildhall, and later in Island Pond.

Political career
A Republican, Dale served as Essex County State's Attorney from 1857 to 1860, and in the Vermont House of Representatives from 1860 to 1861.

In 1861, Dale was appointed Deputy U.S. Collector of Customs in Island Pond, and he served until 1866.

From 1866 to 1870, Dale served in the Vermont Senate, and was Senate President from 1869 to 1870.

Dale won election as Lieutenant Governor in 1870 and served the two years then available under the provisions of the Mountain Rule.

From 1872 to 1882, he again served as Deputy Collector of Customs in Island Pond.

In 1885, Dale became President of the Vermont Bar Association, serving until 1886.

Dale returned to the Vermont House in 1892, and he served in the Vermont Senate for the second time from 1894 to 1896.

In 1901, Dale was appointed U.S. Consul in Coaticook, Quebec, Canada, serving until 1902.

Personal life
Dale married Helen Hinman in 1863 and had three children (one son, Porter Dale, and two daughters). He died in Island Pond on January 29, 1903.

References

1834 births
1903 deaths
Vermont lawyers
State's attorneys in Vermont
Republican Party members of the Vermont House of Representatives
Republican Party Vermont state senators
Presidents pro tempore of the Vermont Senate
Lieutenant Governors of Vermont
People from Guildhall, Vermont
American consuls
Burials in Vermont
People from Fairfax, Vermont
19th-century American politicians
Thetford Academy, Vermont alumni